Giddings Building is a four-story building in downtown Colorado Springs. When it was built in 1898, it was the tallest building in Colorado Springs. It used was a department store owned by the Giddings family until 1950. It has been on the National Register of Historic Places since April 21, 1983.

References

Commercial buildings on the National Register of Historic Places in Colorado
Colorado State Register of Historic Properties
Buildings and structures in Colorado Springs, Colorado
National Register of Historic Places in Colorado Springs, Colorado

Commercial buildings completed in 1898
1898 establishments in Colorado